The women's long jump event at the 2001 European Athletics U23 Championships was held in Amsterdam, Netherlands, at Olympisch Stadion on 12 and 13 July.

Medalists

Results

Final
13 July

Qualifications
12 July
Qualifying 6.45 or 12 best to the Final

Group A

Group B

Participation
According to an unofficial count, 14 athletes from 10 countries participated in the event.

 (2)
 (1)
 (2)
 (1)
 (1)
 (1)
 (2)
 (1)
 (2)
 (1)

References

Long jump
Long jump at the European Athletics U23 Championships